Paul Johnson (born 25 November 1978) is an English former professional rugby league footballer who played in the 1990s, 2000s and 2010s.

Background
Johnson was born in Wigan, Greater Manchester, England.

Wigan Warriors
Johnson made his professional début from the bench as a 17-year-old for Wigan in 1995. 

He played for Wigan from the interchange bench in their 1998 Super League Grand Final victory over Leeds.

Johnson played for Wigan from the interchange bench in their 2001 Super League Grand Final loss to Bradford. 

Johnson played for Wigan from the interchange bench in the 2003 Super League Grand Final which was lost to Bradford.

Bradford Bulls
Johnson joined Bradford from the Wigan club in 2004. Having won Super League VIII, Bradford played against 2003 NRL Premiers, the Penrith Panthers in the 2004 World Club Challenge.

As Super League champions Bradford faced National Rugby League premiers Wests Tigers in the 2006 World Club Challenge.

Warrington Wolves
Johnson joined Warrington from the Bradford side in 2007.

International career
In 1998, Johnson played for Emerging England in a 15–12 victory over Wales.

Johnson made his Great Britain début in 2001, went on to play in the 2004 and 2005 Rugby League Tri-Nations. Johnson was voted 'Back of the Series' against Australia in 2001.

Johnson was then selected in the Great Britain team to compete in the end of season 2004 Rugby League Tri-Nations tournament. In the final against Australia he played from the interchange bench in the Lions' 44–4 loss. 

He missed a large part of the 2005's Super League X with shoulder and thumb injuries but was in sensational form on his return and gained selection for the Tri Nations tournament, scoring a hat-trick against New Zealand.

Personal life
In February 2003 his younger brother, Wigan academy player Craig Johnson, was killed in a car crash along with Billy-Joe Edwards, a promising Wigan academy player and younger brother of former Wigan player Shaun Edwards.

References

External links
!Great Britain Statistics at englandrl.co.uk (statistics currently missing due to not having appeared for both Great Britain, and England)
(archived by web.archive.org) 2001 Ashes profile

1978 births
Living people
Bradford Bulls players
Crusaders Rugby League players
England Knights national rugby league team players
English rugby league players
Great Britain national rugby league team players
Lancashire rugby league team players
Rugby league centres
Rugby league five-eighths
Rugby league locks
Rugby league second-rows
Rugby league wingers
Rugby league players from Wigan
Wakefield Trinity players
Warrington Wolves players
Wigan Warriors players